Tammuz, or Tamuz, is the tenth month of the civil year and the fourth month of the ecclesiastical year on the Hebrew calendar, and the modern Assyrian calendar. It is a month of 29 days, which occurs on the Gregorian calendar around June–July.

The name of the month was adopted from the Assyrian and Babylonian month Araḫ Dumuzu, named in honour of the Mesopotamian deity Dumuzid.

Holidays in Tammuz 
17 Tammuz – Seventeenth of Tammuz – is a fast day from 1 hour before sunrise to sundown in remembrance of Jerusalem's walls being breached. 17 Tammuz is the beginning of The Three Weeks, in which Jews follow similar customs as the ones followed during the Omer from the day following Passover until the culmination of the mourning for the death of the students of Rabbi Akiva (the 33rd day of the Omersuch as refraining from marriage and haircuts.) The Three Weeks culminate with Tisha B'Av (9th of Av).

Ashkenazi communities refrain from wine and meat from the beginning of the month of Av, while Sefardi communities only do so from the second day of the month. The mourning continues until noon on the 10th of Av, the date on which the Second Temple's destruction was complete.

In Jewish history 

 3 Tammuz ( BCE) – Joshua stops the sun (Book of Joshua, 10:1–15)
 3 Tammuz (1927) – the sixth Lubavitcher Rebbe Rabbi Yosef Yitzchak Schneersohn was released from prison and sentenced to three years of exile in the city of Kostroma
 3 Tammuz (1994) – Death of Rabbi Menachem Mendel Schneerson, the Lubavitcher Rebbe
 4 Tammuz (1171) – Death of Rabbeinu Tam
 4 Tammuz (1286) – Meir of Rothenburg imprisoned
 5 Tammuz (c. 592 BCE) – Ezekiel receives his "Chariot" vision (Book of Ezekiel, 1:4–26)
 6 Tammuz (1976) – Operation Entebbe
 9 Tammuz (c. 586 BCE) – Jerusalem walls breached by Nebuchadnezzar II, a date observed as a fast day until the second breaching of Jerusalem's walls by the Roman Empire on the 17th of Tammuz (70 CE)
 12-13 Tammuz (1927) Release of Chabad Rabbi Yosef Yitzchak Schneersohn from prison in Kostroma, Soviet Union; observed by Chabad Hasidim as holy day
 15 Tammuz (1743) – Death of Chaim ibn Attar
 17 Tammuz (c. 1312 BCE) – golden calf offered by the Jewish people, 40 days after the giving of the Torah at Har Sinai. In response, Moses smashed the first Tablets. This is the first of the five national tragedies mourned on this day. 
 17 Tammuz (c. 586 BCE) – The korban in Solomon's Temple were discontinued.
 17 Tammuz (70) – Walls of Jerusalem breached by the Roman army.
 17 Tammuz (135) The Roman general Apostomus burned the Torah and placed an idol in the Second Temple.
 21 Tammuz (1636) – Death of the Kabbalist Baal Shem Elijah Loans, grandson of Johanan Luria and Josel of Rosheim, and author of the Miklol Yofi (Amsterdam, 1695) commentary on Ecclesiastes.
 21 Tammuz (2020) The last Remaining Jews of Yemen are captured by the Houthi Militia
 22 Tammuz (1792) – Death of Rabbi Shlomo of Karlin
 23 Tammuz (1570) – Death of Rabbi Moses ben Jacob Cordovero
 26 Tammuz (2005) – Death of Rabbi Shlomo Zev Zweigenhaft
 28 Tammuz (1841) – Death of Rabbi Moshe Teitelbaum (Ujhel)
 29 Tammuz (150) – Death of Johanan HaSandlar
 29 Tammuz (1105) – Death of Rashi
 29 Tammuz (1940) – Death of Ze'ev Jabotinsky; secular observance by Israel as Jabotinsky Day

In fiction 
 In the story of Xenogears, Tammuz is the name of a country, named after the Hebrew month. In the official Japanese version translation, however, it was transliterated Tamuzu. This was later further changed by the translation process to "Thames" for the English version.

See also 
 Jewish astrology
 "Tammūz" (Arabic: ﺗﻤﻮﺯ), is also the name for the month of July in Iraq, the Levant and Turkey ("Temmuz" in Turkish). In Syriac it is ܬܡܘܙ. In Lebanon, Syria, and the Palestinian territories, the 2006 Lebanon War is generally known as حرب تموز Ḥarb Tammūz (i.e. the July War), following the Arab custom of naming the Arab-Israeli wars after months or years.

References

External links 
 This Month in Jewish History

 
Months of the Hebrew calendar